Khvastovo is a rural locality (a village) in Komyanskoye Rural Settlement, Gryazovetsky District, Vologda Oblast, Russia. The population was 19 as of 2002.

Geography 
Khvastovo is located 23 km north of Gryazovets (the district's administrative centre) by road. Yevdokimovo is the nearest rural locality.

References 

Rural localities in Gryazovetsky District